DM Lyrae (DM Lyr for short) is a dwarf nova in the constellation Lyra.  This binary system is composed of a primary star of unknown type, and a white dwarf companion. It erupted in 1928 and 1996 and reached about magnitude 13.

See also 
 RS Ophiuchi
 HR Lyrae
 V838 Monocerotis

References

External links 

Dwarf novae
Lyra (constellation)
Lyrae, DM